was a Japanese samurai leader in the Sengoku period. He was the ninth head of the Isshiki clan.

He was the son of Isshiki Yoshiyuki.  He was the father of Isshiki Yoshisada. He committed seppuku when Yada castle was attacked by the Oda clan force led by Hosokawa Fujitaka.

References

Daimyo
Year of birth missing
1579 deaths